Willy F. Vande Walle (born November 21, 1949) is a Belgian academic, author, Japanologist and Sinologist.

Willy Vande Walle was born in Roeselare, Belgium.  His secondary education focused on classical humanities (Greek-Latin) at Klein Seminarie Roeselare (1962–1968).  He studied Oriental Philology and History at the State University of Ghent and earned his doctoral degree in Oriental Philology in 1976.

Career
Willy Vande Walle is Professor Emeritus of Japanese Studies at the Catholic University of Leuven (Katholieke Universiteit Leuven or KU Leuven) in Belgium. He taught several classes such as Japanese language and literature, history of Japan, art history of East Asia, as well as history of China and Chinese poetry. The KU Leuven coursework is supplemented with active Internet learning programs linked to Japanese educational partners.

Willy Vande Walle is the Belgian coordinator for projects conducted by the European Association of Japanese Studies.

Honors
 * Japan Foundation: Japan Foundation Special Prize, 1992.
 Order of the Rising Sun, Gold Rays with Neck Ribbon, 2000.

Main publications
 1987 – Stratification in Verbiest's Works: The Astronomia Europaea and the Memorials.
 1989 – Takakura – Habits de la cour impériale du Japon / Keizerlijke gewaden uit Japan (with Muneyuki Sengoku). Brussels: Europalia Foundation International.
 1989 – Splendeur du théâtre No / Luister van het No-theater (with Eileen Kato, Tomoyuki Yamanobe & Shozo Masuda). Brussels: Europalia Foundation International.
 2001 --  Dodonæus in Japan: Translation and the Scientific Mind in the Tokugawa Period (with Kazuhiko Kasaya). Leuven: Leuven University Press. ; OCLC  49539599 -- simultaneously published in Kyoto: International Research Center for Japanese Studies.
 2001 – Dodonæus in Japan: Translation and the Scientific Mind in the Tokugawa Period (with Kazuhiko Kasaya). Leuven: Leuven University Press. ; OCLC  49539599 – simultaneously published in Kyoto: International Research Center for Japanese Studies.
 2003 --  The History of the Relations Between the Low Countries and China in the Qing Era (1644-1911) with Noël Golvers. Leuven Chinese Studies XIV. Leuven: Leuven University Press.  
 2005 (as editor)-- Japan & Belgium: Four Centuries of Exchange. Brussels: Commissioners-General of the Belgian Government at the Universal Exposition of Aichi 2005, Japan.

Notes

References
  Meyvis, Ludo.  "Japanologie zoekt nieuwe wegen," Campus krant (Katholieke Universiteit Leuven).  10 May 2004.
  Meyvis, Ludo. "Japanologie zoekt nieuwe wegen," Campus krant (Katholieke Universiteit Leuven).  May 10, 2004.
   "'Lost in Toykio' in opspraak: alles voor het geld?" TV-Visie. 18 March 2008.
  "'Lost in Toykio' in opspraak: alles voor het geld?" TV-Visie. March 18, 2008.
  The Japan Foundation Awards / Special Prizes (2000)  Japanese ver.

Living people
Belgian Japanologists
Belgian sinologists
Recipients of the Order of the Rising Sun, 3rd class
1949 births
Academic staff of KU Leuven